Davydkovo is a rural locality (a village) in Zhityovskoye Rural Settlement, Syamzhensky District, Vologda Oblast, Russia. The population was 5 as of 2002.

Geography 
Davydkovo is located 15 km southeast of Syamzha (the district's administrative centre) by road. Yakovlevskaya is the nearest rural locality.

References 

Rural localities in Syamzhensky District